Lišnice is a municipality and village in Most District in the Ústí nad Labem Region of the Czech Republic. It has about 200 inhabitants.

Administrative parts
Villages of Koporeč and Nemilkov are administrative parts of Lišnice.

References

External links

Villages in Most District